James Duerden was an English professional footballer who played as a full back.

1888–89 
Duerden played twice for  Blackburn Rovers during the inaugural  Football League season. His League debut was on 19 January 1889 at Thorneyholme Road, Accrington the home of Accrington. Duerden was selected to play outside-left and he assisted his team achieve a comfortable 2–0 win. Duerden returned to the team for the last match of the season. This was 15 April 1889, at Leamington Road, Blackburn, then home of Blackburn Rovers, and Duerden now played centre-half. Blackburn Rovers easily beat Derby County 3-0 and finished in 4th place.

He played three matches in the Football League for Blackburn Rovers and Burnley before moving to Rossendale United in 1891.

References

Year of birth unknown
Year of death missing
English footballers
Association football defenders
Blackburn Rovers F.C. players
Burnley F.C. players
Rossendale United F.C. players
English Football League players